Three ships of the Royal Navy have borne the name HMS Whitby, after the Yorkshire seaside town of Whitby:

  was a 12-gun storeship purchased in 1780 and sold in 1785.
  was a  launched in 1954 and sold for scrapping in 1978.

See also
 

Royal Navy ship names